Eric T. Lavigne (born November 4, 1972) is a Canadian former professional ice hockey defenceman.

Biography
Lavigne was born in Victoriaville, Quebec. As a youth, he played in the 1985 Quebec International Pee-Wee Hockey Tournament with a minor ice hockey team from Beauport, Quebec City.

Lavigne was selected in the 2nd round (25th overall) in the 1991 NHL Entry Draft by the Washington Capitals. He played one game in the National Hockey League with the Los Angeles Kings during the 1994–95 NHL season. He also played in the International Hockey League, the American Hockey League, and later in the Ligue Nord-Américaine de Hockey.

See also
List of players who played only one game in the NHL

References

External links

1972 births
Canadian ice hockey defencemen
Ice hockey people from Quebec
Living people
Los Angeles Blades players
Los Angeles Kings players
P.E.I. Rocket coaches
People from Victoriaville
Quebec Remparts coaches
Val-d'Or Foreurs coaches
Washington Capitals draft picks
Canadian ice hockey coaches